Tivyna moaba is a species of mesh web weaver in the family of spiders known as Dictynidae. It is found in the US.

References

Dictynidae
Articles created by Qbugbot
Spiders described in 1947